Sílvio Romero de Lemos Meira (Taperoá, Paraíba, 2 February 1955) is a Brazilian computer scientist, professor and entrepreneur in the area of software engineering and innovation. Currently, he is an emeritus professor at the Centre of Informatics of the Federal University of Pernambuco. Additionally, he also is the chairman of the Porto Digital - the biggest Brazilian tech park - and is member of the board of directors in several companies. Meira is also founder and chief scientist at tds.company.

He is co-founder of the Recife Center for Advanced Studies and Systems, where he served as chief scientist for 12 years.

References

External links

1955 births
Living people
People from Paraíba
Brazilian computer scientists
Brazilian columnists
Brazilian bloggers
Software engineering researchers
Academic staff of the Federal University of Pernambuco
Commanders of the National Order of Scientific Merit (Brazil)
Alumni of the University of Kent